The 36th Street station is an express station on the BMT Fourth Avenue Line of the New York City Subway, located at 36th Street and Fourth Avenue in Sunset Park, Brooklyn. It is served by the D, N, and R trains at all times. During rush hours, several W and northbound Q trains also serve the station.

The 36th Street station was constructed as part of the Fourth Avenue Line, which was approved in 1905. Construction on the segment of the line that includes 36th Street started on December 10, 1909, and was completed in October 1912. The station opened on June 22, 1915, as part of the initial portion of the BMT Fourth Avenue Line to 59th Street. The station's entrances were relocated in 1929, and the platforms were lengthened during a renovation in 1968–1970. The station was renovated again in 1996–1997, and it is planned to receive elevators as part of the Metropolitan Transportation Authority's 2020–2024 Capital Program.

History

Construction 
The 36th Street station was constructed as part of the Fourth Avenue Line, the plan for which was initially adopted on June 1, 1905. The Rapid Transit Commission was succeeded on July 1, 1907, by the New York State Public Service Commission (PSC), which approved the plan for the line in late 1907. The contract for the section of the line that included the 36th Street station, Route 11A4, which extended from 27th Street to 43rd Street, was awarded on May 22, 1908, to the E.E. Smith Construction Company for $2,769.913.97. The New York City Board of Estimate approved the contract on October 29, 1909. Construction on the segment started on December 10, 1909, and was completed in October 1912.

As part of negotiations between New York City, the Brooklyn Rapid Transit Company (BRT), and the Interborough Rapid Transit Company for the expansion of the city's transit network, the line was leased to a subsidiary of the BRT. The agreement, known as Contract 4 of the Dual Contracts, was signed on March 19, 1913. 36th Street opened on June 22, 1915, as part of an extension of the subway to Coney Island, which included the Fourth Avenue Line north of 59th Street as well as the entire Sea Beach Line. The station's opening was marked with a competition between two trains heading from Chambers Street station in Manhattan to the Coney Island station, one heading via the West End Line and the other via the Sea Beach Line; the latter got to Coney Island first. As part of the Dual Contracts, the original southern half of the station was closed to make room for an above-ground connection to the BMT West End Line, and a new northern half was constructed. As an express station, the station was originally  to accommodate eight-car trains.

Modifications and later changes

1910s to 1930s
In 1915, the Sunset Park Civic Association petitioned for the construction of an entrance to the station from 33rd Street and Fourth Avenue. This request was turned down by the New York State Transit Commission. In 1929, the entrances to the station, along with those at Pacific Street and 59th Street, were relocated from the center median of Fourth Avenue to the sidewalks to accommodate the widening of the street. In December 1934, a request to construct an additional entrance to the station was brought before the Public Service Committee of the Merchants and Manufacturers Association of Bush Terminal.

1940s to 1990s
The city government took over the BMT's operations on June 1, 1940. In July 1959, the New York City Transit Authority (NYCTA) announced that it would install fluorescent lighting at the 36th Street station and five other stations along the Fourth Avenue Line for between $175,000 and $200,000. Bids on the project were to be advertised on August 7, 1959, and completed by fall 1960.

On July 14, 1967, the NYCTA awarded a contract to conduct test borings at eleven stations on the Fourth Avenue Line, including 36th Street, to the W. M. Walsh Corporation for $6,585 in preparation of the construction of platform extensions. The NYCTA issued an invitation for bids on the project to extend the platforms at stations along the Fourth Avenue Line between Pacific Street and 36th Street, on March 28, 1969. Funding for the renovation projects came out of the NYCTA's 1969–1970 Capital Budget, costing $8,177,890 in total.

In June 1980, new telephones were installed on the platform at this station and nine others in Brooklyn, following a request by the New York City Council for their installation in crime-prone subway stations. The station was overhauled from 1996 to 1997. The changes included retiled walls, rebuilt staircases, new tiling on the floors, upgrading the station's lights, installing ADA yellow safety treads along the platform edge, and new track-beds for local and express trains. It also included an art installation by Owen Smith called An Underground Movement: Designers, Builders, Riders. It features ceramic mosaics on mezzanine and stairway walls, and depicts the workers that have made the subway system possible.

2000s to present
In May 2018, New York City Transit Authority President Andy Byford announced his subway and bus modernization plan, known as Fast Forward, which included making an additional 50 stations compliant with the Americans with Disabilities Act of 1990 during the 2020–2024 Metropolitan Transportation Authority (MTA) Capital Program to allow most riders to have an accessible station every two or three stops. The draft 2020–2024 Capital Program released in September 2019 included 66 stations that would receive ADA improvements, including 36th Street.

During the morning rush hour on April 12, 2022, 62-year-old Frank James threw smoke bombs into the station before shooting several people. Several routes were delayed or temporarily closed, and a total of 29 people were injured.

Station layout

36th Street is an express station with four tracks and two island platforms. R and W trains provide local service, while D and N trains run express (except during nights when they also run local). South of here, N, R, and W trains continue on Fourth Avenue, while D trains diverge east onto the BMT West End Line. This is one of two "36th Street" stations served by the R train; the other is 36th Street on the IND Queens Boulevard Line.

The station originally featured two mezzanines. The mezzanine in what is now the southern half of the station was originally the northern one. A second southern mezzanine was isolated and closed off when the original southern half of the station was closed to make way for the West End Line. However, it is still intact; it was converted to a signal relay room and can be reached by an intact stairway in the tunnel.

Exits
The station's only two exits are from the open northern mezzanine above the tracks at the very south end of the station. Outside fare control, two street stairs lead to the northwest corner of 4th Avenue and 36th Street. Another street stair leads to the northeast corner.

Proposed subway under 40th Street
There are three abandoned trackways south of the 36th Street station. One trackway merges with the southbound local track, and the other two trackways are south of the tracks that ramp up to the BMT West End Line. The triple trackway ramps down to a lower level, under the mainline tracks, and curves slightly east before ending. On the main track level, a bellmouth going east is visible from a Manhattan-bound local train, just south of this station. When the subway was planned as part of the Triborough System, use of the South Brooklyn (SBK) cut was not anticipated, and instead a four-track subway was to be built in 40th Street to reach the equivalent of the Culver and West End lines. The unused junction is to the east side of Fourth Avenue.

Nearby points of interest
 Green-Wood Cemetery
 Industry City

Notes

References

External links 

 
 Station Reporter — D Train
 Station Reporter — N Train
 Station Reporter — R Train
 The Subway Nut — 36th Street Pictures 
 MTA's Arts For Transit — 36th Street (BMT Fourth Avenue Line)
 36th Street entrance from Google Maps Street View
 Platform from Google Maps Street View

BMT Fourth Avenue Line stations
New York City Subway stations in Brooklyn
Railway stations in the United States opened in 1915
1915 establishments in New York City
Sunset Park, Brooklyn